Kristian Johan Fossheim (born 4 December 1935) is a Norwegian physicist.

He was born in Jølster. He took the dr.philos. degree in 1972, was an associate professor at the Norwegian Institute of Technology from 1970 to 1980, and professor from 1980. He has been vice-praeses of the Royal Norwegian Society of Sciences and Letters, and is a member of the Norwegian Academy of Science and Letters and the 
Norwegian Academy of Technological Sciences.

References

1935 births
Living people
People from Jølster
Norwegian physicists
Academic staff of the Norwegian Institute of Technology
Academic staff of the Norwegian University of Science and Technology
Royal Norwegian Society of Sciences and Letters
Members of the Norwegian Academy of Science and Letters
Members of the Norwegian Academy of Technological Sciences